Grégoire Puel (born 20 February 1992) is a French footballer who plays as a right back.

Career
Born in Nice, Puel was an academy player at Lyon but never made the first team, instead featuring for the reserve team in the Championnat de France Amateur (fourth tier). In 2012, he signed for OGC Nice, managed by his father Claude. He made his professional debut in Ligue 1 on 16 February 2013, as the side won 1–0 at Bastia. He scored once for the Cote d'Azur club, in a 3–1 home loss to former team Lyon on 1 November 2014.

In August 2015, Puel cancelled his Nice contract by mutual accord and moved to Ligue 2 club Le Havre on a two-year deal with the option of a third. His time in Normandy was split almost equally between the club's first and second teams.

New Le Havre manager Oswald Tanchot did not field Puel at all in 2016–17, and passed up the opportunity of a contract extension, leaving him free to join Gazélec Ajaccio of the same league on a two-year deal in July 2017. He scored once for the Corsicans, in a 2–0 home win over Nîmes the following 23 January, and was released following their relegation in 2019.

Personal life
Puel is the son of the French manager and former footballer Claude Puel, and older brother of footballer Paulin Puel. All three were colleagues at Nice.

References

External links
 

Living people
1992 births
Footballers from Nice
Association football forwards
French footballers
Ligue 1 players
Ligue 2 players
Championnat National 2 players
Championnat National 3 players
Olympique Lyonnais players
OGC Nice players
Le Havre AC players
Gazélec Ajaccio players
Liga I players
FC Voluntari players
French expatriate footballers
French expatriate sportspeople in Romania
Expatriate footballers in Romania